Aghat is a 1986 Bangladeshi film starring Alamgir, Rojina and Rosy Afsari in lead roles. 
The film released on 15 August 1986.  The film earned Best Editor's Award in 11th Bangladesh National Film Awards.

Cast
  Alamgir - Masood
 Rozina - Mitu
 Prabir Mitra - Rashed
 Golam Mustafa - Masud's father
 Rosie Afsari - Mother of Mitu and Rashed
  Anwar Hossain - Master Saheb
 Sadeq Bachchu
 Black Anwar
 Akhtar Hossain
 Syed Akhtar Ali

Music
The film's music has been composed by Alauddin Ali.

Accolades

References

External links

1986 films
Bengali-language Bangladeshi films
1980s Bengali-language films
Films scored by Alauddin Ali